St Michael and All Angels Church, on Mount Dinham in Exeter is an Anglican church in Devon, England. It is a Grade I listed building.
The church is Anglo-Catholic in tradition. The building in is the early Gothic style and was built to the designs of Major Rohde Hawkins, 1867–68. The reredos is by W. D. Caroe, 1899.

Within the Parish of St David with St Michael and All Angels, the building towers above its surroundings, the spire exceeding the height of even the towers of Exeter Cathedral.

History
The foundation stone was laid on 10 August 1865 and construction was largely financed by businessman and Oxford Movement supporter William Gibbs who came from a local family. The church was consecrated on 31 October 1868 by the Bishop of Fredericton.

Organ

The first organ was installed in 1866 and was by William Hill & Son. This was replaced by an organ originally in St Jude's Church, Birmingham, dating from 1867 and built by Edward James Bossward. It was installed and much enlarged by Tim Trenchard in 2013. A specification of the organ can be found on the National Pipe Organ Register.

References

Church of England church buildings in Devon
Diocese of Exeter
Churches in Exeter
Grade I listed churches in Devon
Tourist attractions in Exeter
Churches completed in 1868
Anglo-Catholic church buildings in Devon